Foreign relations exist between Austria and South Korea.  Diplomatic relations between the two countries were established on May 22, 1963.

Missions
Austria has an embassy in Seoul and an honorary consulate in Busan.  South Korea has an embassy in Vienna and 4 honorary consulates (in Graz, Klagenfurt, Linz and Salzburg). The Austrian embassy in Seoul is located in the same building as the Australian embassy, often leading to misdelivered mail and confused visitors.

Trade
In 2007, South Korea was Austria's fourth-largest non-European Union trading partner. Two way trade was valued at about US$1.8 billion that year.

Bilateral visits
In April 2007, the President of Austria Heinz Fischer paid a state visit to South Korea.  It was the first ever state visit of an Austrian President to the republic.

See also 
 Foreign relations of Austria
 Foreign relations of South Korea

Notes and references

External links 
  Austrian Foreign Ministry: list of bilateral treaties with South Korea (in German only)
  Austrian embassy in Seoul (in German and Korean only)
  South Korean Ministry of Foreign Affairs and Trade about relations with Austria
  South Korean embassy in Vienna

 
Korea, South
Bilateral relations of South Korea